Carleton O'Brien (1903 Providence, Rhode Island-May 1952) was an organized crime figure involved in bookkeeping and policy operations in Rhode Island. Formerly listed as Public Enemy No. 1 by state officials, O'Brien was one of the last independent racketeers as the Patriarca crime family began establishing themselves in Providence. He was also an associate of bank robber Joseph "Specs" O'Keefe and was involved in the planning of the Great Brinks Robbery during the early 1950s.

On the evening of May 1952, after returning from a local roadhouse, his body was found in the backyard of his Cranston home (although other accounts claim he was gunned down during the afternoon in a street in Pawtucket) after being shot and killed by an unidentified gunman.

References

O'Brien was found murdered in the yard of his West Warwick, Rhode Island, home near the Cranston line.

External links
WhiteyWorld.com - Carleton O'Brien

1903 births
1952 deaths
American gangsters
Murdered American gangsters of Irish descent
People murdered in Rhode Island
Deaths by firearm in Rhode Island
People from Providence, Rhode Island
Criminals from Rhode Island